The 2012 Discover Orange Bowl was a postseason college football bowl game on Wednesday, January 4, 2012, at Sun Life Stadium, now known as Hard Rock Stadium, in Miami Gardens, Florida. The West Virginia Mountaineers defeated the Clemson Tigers by a score of 70–33. West Virginia tied or broke eight separate team and individual bowl game records, while the combined 69 points West Virginia and Clemson scored in the first half set another new record.  The game was part of the 2011–2012 Bowl Championship Series of the 2011 NCAA Division I FBS football season and was the concluding game of the season for both teams.

Teams
The two schools were meeting for the second time. Coming into the game, Clemson had a 1–0 record over WVU, with a 27–7 victory in the 1989 Gator Bowl. This was Clemson's fourth appearance in the Orange Bowl, while it marked the first time WVU had been invited. Both teams averaged at least 33 points and over 440 yards per game.

West Virginia

West Virginia finished the season in a three-way tie for the Big East Conference title, but earned the conference's BCS bid since it was the highest-ranked team in the final BCS rankings. The team scored 419 points (34.9 per game) this season, fourth highest average in school history. The Mountaineers scored 30 or more points in eight games, 40 or more points in four games and 50 or more points in two games during 2011. This year's team set a new school mark in the passing game (4,102 yards) with receiver Stedman Bailey accounting for 1,197 yards (a school record) and scoring 11 touchdowns.

Clemson

Clemson won its first ACC championship in twenty years and appeared in its first major bowl since the 1982 Orange Bowl, when they won the national championship. The Tigers were 21st in the nation in passing with 285 yards per game. The team was led by quarterback Tajh Boyd, who was 18th in total offense, and by wide receiver Sammy Watkins, who was fourth in the nation with 173 yards per game. Watkins was also rated top-25 in receptions per game and kickoff returns.

Records
West Virginia and Clemson together set or tied nine separate bowl records at the Orange Bowl:
 Team touchdowns: West Virginia's ten touchdowns tied the record.
 Combined points in a half: The 69 points between West Virginia and Clemson at halftime set a new record.
 Total points: West Virginia's 70 points broke the record set one week earlier by Baylor in the 2011 Alamo Bowl. This particular record would be tied by Army in the 2018 Armed Forces Bowl.
 Points in a quarter: West Virginia's 35 points in the second quarter set a new record.
 Points in a half: West Virginia's 49 points in the first half set a new record. The previous record was 45, held by Colorado at the 1999 Insight.com Bowl and Oklahoma State at the 1988 Holiday Bowl. This record stood until the 2018 Music City Bowl, when Auburn led Purdue 56–7 at halftime, going on to win 63–14.
 Individual passing touchdowns: Geno Smith's six touchdowns tied Chuck Long's record in the 1984 Freedom Bowl.
 Individual total touchdowns: Smith also rushed for a touchdown, giving him seven overall which tied another record.
 Individual total points: Smith's seven touchdowns scored 42 points, also tying a record.
 Individual receiving touchdowns: Tavon Austin's four touchdown receptions, becoming the fourth player to do so in a bowl game.

Gallery

References

Orange Bowl
Orange Bowl
Clemson Tigers football bowl games
West Virginia Mountaineers football bowl games
Orange Bowl
January 2012 sports events in the United States